Balkh (Dari: , Balx) is one of the 34 provinces of Afghanistan, located in the north of the country. It is divided into 15 districts and has a population of about 1,509,183, which is multi-ethnic and mostly a Persian-speaking society. The city of Mazar-i-Sharif serves as the capital of the province. The Mazar-i-Sharif International Airport and Camp Marmal sit on the eastern edge of Mazar-i-Sharif.

Balkh, also called Vazīrābād, The name of the province is derived from the ancient city of Balkh, near the modern town. The city of Mazar-e-Sharif has been an important stop on the trade routes from the Far East to the Middle East, the Mediterranean and Europe. Home to the famous blue mosque, it was once destroyed by Genghis Khan but later rebuilt by Timur. The city of Balkh and the area of Balkh Province were considered a part of various historical regions in history including Ariana and Greater Khorasan.

The province serves today as Afghanistan's second but main gateway to Central Asia, the other being Sherkhan Bandar in the Kunduz Province. Balkh Province borders Jowzjan, Sar-e Pol, Samangan and Kunduz provinces, and the Surxondaryo Region of Uzbekistan to the north.

Geography

Balkh Province is situated in the northern part of Afghanistan, bordering Turkmenistan in the north-west, bordering Uzbekistan in the north, Tajikistan in the north-east, Kunduz Province in the east, Samangan Province in the south-east, Sar-e Pol Province in the south-west and Jowzjan Province in the west. The province covers an area of 16,840 km2. Nearly half of the province is mountainous or semi-mountainous terrain (48.7%) while half of the area (50.2%) is made up of flat land.

History

Ancient history

The Bactria-Margiana Archaeological Complex (BMAC, also known as the "Oxus civilization") is the modern archaeological designation for a Bronze Age culture of Central Asia, dated to ca. 2200–1700 BCE, located in present-day Turkmenistan, northern Afghanistan, southern Uzbekistan and western Tajikistan, centered on the upper Amu Darya (Oxus), in area covering ancient Bactria. Its sites were discovered and named by the Soviet archaeologist Viktor Sarianidi (1976). Bactria was the Greek name for the area of Bakhlo (modern Balkh), in what is now northern Afghanistan, and Margiana was the Greek name for the Persian satrapy of Margu, the capital of which was Merv, in today's Turkmenistan.

The early Greek historian Ctesias c. 400 BCE (followed by Diodorus Siculus) alleged that the legendary Assyrian king Ninus had defeated a Bactrian king named Oxyartes in ca. 2140 BC, or some 1000 years before the Trojan War. Ever since the discovery of cuneiform enabled actual Assyrian records to be deciphered in the 19th century, however, historians have ascribed little value to the Greek account.

According to some writers, Bactria was the homeland of Indo-European tribes who moved south-west into what is today Iran and into the north-western Indian Subcontinent (modern day Pakistan and India) around 2500–2000 BCE. Later, it became the northern province of the Achaemenid Empire. It was in these regions, where the fertile soil of the mountainous country is surrounded by the Turanian desert, that the prophet Zoroaster (Zarathushtra) was said to have been born and gained his first adherents. Avestan, the language of the oldest portions of the Zoroastrian Avesta, was one of the old Iranian languages, and is the oldest attested member of the Eastern Iranian branch of the Iranian language family.

It is suggested by E. Herzfeld that Bactria once belonged to the Median empire. It was annexed by the Achaemenid Persians in the 6th century BCE and together with Margiana it formed the twelfth satrapy of the Achaemenids. After Darius III of Persia was defeated by Alexander the Great and killed in the ensuing chaos, his murderer Bessus, the satrap of Bactria, tried to organize a national resistance based on his satrapie but was captured by other warlords and delivered to Alexander. He was then tortured and killed.

Alexander the Great conquered Sogdiana and Persia. However, in the south, beyond the Oxus, he met strong resistance. After two years of war Bactria was occupied by the Macedonians, but Alexander never successfully subdued the people. After Alexander's death, the Macedonian Empire was eventually divided up between several generals in Alexander's army. Bactria became part of Seleucus I, the founder of the Seleucid Empire.

"The famed Bactrian Empire of a thousand cities, wallowing in wealth (opulentissimum illud mille urbium Bactrianum imperium)"

The many difficulties against which the Seleucid kings had to fight and the attacks of Ptolemy II of Egypt gave Diodotus, satrap of Bactria, the opportunity to declare independence (about 255 BCE) and conquer Sogdiana. He was the founder of the Greco-Bactrian Kingdom. Diodotus and his successors were able to maintain themselves against the attacks of the Seleucids—particularly from Antiochus III the Great, who was ultimately defeated by the Romans (190 BCE).

The Greco-Bactrians were so powerful that they were able to expand their territory as far as India:
"As for Bactria, a part of it lies alongside Aria towards the north, though most of it lies above Aria and to the east of it. And much of it produces everything except oil. The Greeks who caused Bactria to revolt grew so powerful on account of the fertility of the country that they became masters, not only of Bactria and beyond, but also of India, as Apollodorus of Artemita says: and more tribes were subdued by them than by Alexander...."

The Greco-Bactrians used Greek language for administrative purposes, and the local Bactrian language was also Hellenized, as suggested by its adoption of the Greek alphabet and Greek loanwords. In turn, some of these words were also borrowed by modern Pashto, the language of Afghanistan.

The weakness of the Greco-Bactrians was shown by its sudden and complete overthrow, first by the Sakas, and then by the Yuezhi (who later became known as Kushans), who had conquered Bactria by the time of the visit of the Chinese envoy Zhang Qian (circa 127 BCE), who had been sent by the Han emperor to investigate lands to the west of China.

Under the Sassanids the province would become part of the area known as Khorasan.

Kujula Kadphises, the Guishuang xihou (or prince) of the Da Yuezhi, united the region in the early 1st century and laid the foundations for the powerful, but short-lived, Kushan Empire (1st to 3rd century CE), which was then overcome by the Sassanians from Persia. The name Daxia appears in Chinese from the 3rd century BCE to designate a mythical kingdom to the West, possibly a consequence of the first contacts with the expansion of the Greco-Bactrian Kingdom, and then is used by the explorer Zhang Qian in 126 BCE to designate Bactria.

The reports of Zhang Qian were put in writing in the Shiji ("Records of the Grand Historian") by Sima Qian in the 1st century BCE. They describe an important urban civilization of about one million people, living in walled cities under small city kings or magistrates. Daxia was an affluent country with rich markets, trading in an incredible variety of objects, coming as far as Southern China. By the time Zhang Qian visited Daxia, there was no longer a major king, and the Bactrian were suzerains to the nomadic Yuezhi, who were settled to the north of their territory beyond the Oxus (Amu Darya). Overall Zhang Qian depicted a rather sophisticated but demoralized people who were afraid of war.

Following these reports, the Chinese Emperor Wu Di was informed of the level of sophistication of the urban civilizations of Ferghana, Bactria and Parthia, and became interested in developing commercial relationship with them:

"The Son of Heaven on hearing all this reasoned thus: Ferghana (Dayuan) and the possessions of Bactria (Daxia) and Parthia (Anxi) are large countries, full of rare things, with a population living in fixed abodes and given to occupations somewhat identical with those of the Chinese people, but with weak armies, and placing great value on the rich produce of China" (Hanshu, Former Han History).

These contacts immediately led to the dispatch of multiple embassies from the Chinese, which helped to develop the Silk Road.

Modern history

As of January 2022, clashes between Taliban and guerrilla bands have been reported in the province

On 9 March 2023, Daud Muzamil, the Taliban governor of Afghanistan's Balkh province was killed in a blast at his office.

Economy

Like in other parts of Afghanistan, agriculture plays an important part of Balkh's economy. It is known for producing some of the sweetest melons and grapes. It is expected that the province will witness a major agriculture boost in the near future after the Qush Tepa Canal is completed, which "will irrigate 500,000 hectares of land in Balkh, Jawzjan and Faryab provinces." This will significantly increase Balkh's economy and population as many Afghans from other parts of the country will move to the province for employment purposes.

Mining
On October 5, 2018, in Washington, D.C., Afghan officials signed a 30-year contract involving a $56 million investment by investment group Centar and its operating company Afghan Gold and Minerals Co. for exploration of an area covering 500 square km for copper, with development of mining due to begin thereafter.

Healthcare

The percentage of households with clean drinking water increased from 8% in 2005 to 15% in 2011.
The percentage of births attended by a skilled birth attendant increased from 0% in 2005 to 20% in 2011. In 2018 Dr.Khalilullah Hekmati was appointed the Public Health Director which was followed by positive changes in the Health sector.

Education

The overall literacy rate (6+ years of age) increased from 12% in 2005 to 23% in 2011. 
The overall net enrolment rate (6–13 years of age) increased from 22% in 2005 to 46% in 2011.

Demographics 
As of 2020, the total population of the province is about 1,509,183, which is a multi-ethnic and mostly Persian-speaking (63% Tajik, 20% Hazara) society.

According to the Naval Postgraduate School:Balkh is ethnically diverse, including substantial Tajik, Hazara, Pashtuns, Arab, Uzbek, Turkomen, and Sunni Hazara (Kawshi) communities.

According to the World Food ProgramAround 66% of the population of Balkh lives in rural districts while 34% lives in urban areas. Around 51% of the population is male and 49% is female. The major ethnic groups living in Balkh province are Tajiks and Pashtuns followed by Uzbek, Hazaras, Turkman, Arab and Baluch. Dari is spoken by about 50% of the population and 58% of the villages. The second most frequent language is Pashto, spoken by the majorities in 266 villages representing 27% of the population, followed by Turkmani (11.9%) and Uzbeki (10.7%).

Districts
Balkh province is divided into 15 districts.

Sport

The locals of Balkh take great pride in their sporting history and culture. Every Nowruz (Persian New Year), Balkh is the site of many sporting events. Buzkashi is a traditional horse riding sport of the region and is very popular in this province. Kurash or traditional wrestling is also a popular sport in the province. However, the most popular presently and for the last 50 years has been football, this was evident in the Balkh team Simorgh Alborz F.C. finishing runners up in the inaugural Afghan Premier League and in their contributions to the National Team.

Notable people
 
 
Abdul Ghani Ghani, political representative
Mohammad Zabihullah, anti-soviet resistance leader
Rumi, persian poet 
Ismail Samani, persian king
Roxana, greek princess 
Avicenna, persian polymatch 
Atta Muhammad Nur, afghan politician
Rabia Balkhi, persian poet 
Abdul Ali Mazari, hazara military leader
Wazir Akbar Khan, afghan prince
Abdur Rahman Khan, afghan emir

See also
 Almoghul
 Balkh (Town in northern Afghanistan)
 Provinces of Afghanistan
 Tal-e ʽAsheqan
 Bactria

References

External links

 Balkh Province by the Naval Postgraduate School
 Provincial Profile - Balkh (pdf)
 Balkh.com Official Website of Balkh